Rudolf Steiner (1861–1925) was an Austrian philosopher and polymath.

Rudolf Steiner may also refer to:

 Rudolf Steiner (footballer, born 1903) (1903–1994), Romanian footballer
 Rudolf Steiner (footballer, born 1937) (1937–2015), German footballer
 Rudolf Steiner (film director) (born 1942), German film director
 Rudolf Steiner (athlete) (born 1951), Swiss track and field athlete